Delhi Township is one of the twenty-six townships of Redwood County, Minnesota, United States. The population was 298 at the 2000 census.

Delhi Township was organized in 1876, and named after Delhi Township, Hamilton County, Ohio in the Cincinnati metropolitan area.

Geography

The city of Delhi is located in Delhi Township, plus a corner of the county seat of Redwood Falls.

Demographics
As of the census of 2000, there were 298 people, 109 households, and 84 families residing in the township.  The population density was 9.0 people per square mile (3.5/km2).  There were 114 housing units at an average density of 3.4/sq mi (1.3/km2).  The racial makeup of the township was 97.32% White, 2.01% Native American, 0.34% from other races, and 0.34% from two or more races. Hispanic or Latino of any race were 0.34% of the population.

There were 109 households, out of which 34.9% had children under the age of 18 living with them, 69.7% were married couples living together, 3.7% had a female householder with no husband present, and 22.9% were non-families. 20.2% of all households were made up of individuals, and 10.1% had someone living alone who was 65 years of age or older.  The average household size was 2.73 and the average family size was 3.17.

In the township the population was spread out, with 28.2% under the age of 18, 6.4% from 18 to 24, 25.8% from 25 to 44, 26.5% from 45 to 64, and 13.1% who were 65 years of age or older.  The median age was 39 years. For every 100 females, there were 120.7 males.  For every 100 females age 18 and over, there were 111.9 males.

The median income for a household in the township was $55,833, and the median income for a family was $60,139. Males had a median income of $43,750 versus $20,625 for females. The per capita income for the township was $18,748.  About 5.6% of families and 5.4% of the population were below the poverty line, including 5.6% of those under the age of eighteen and none of those 65 or over.

References

Townships in Redwood County, Minnesota
Townships in Minnesota